Halielloides fragilis is a species of sea snail, a marine gastropod mollusk of the family Eulimidae. This species, along with Halielloides nitidus and Halielloides verrilliana, belongs in the genus Halielloides.

Distribution

This species occurs in the following locations:

 European waters (ERMS scope)
 United Kingdom Exclusive Economic Zone

References

External links
 To World Register of Marine Species

Eulimidae
Gastropods described in 1986